The 6th Alberta Legislative Assembly was in session from February 10, 1927, to May 10, 1930, with the membership of the assembly determined by the results of the 1926 Alberta general election held on June 28, 1926. The Legislature officially resumed on February 10, 1927, and continued until the fourth session was prorogued on April 3, 1930 and dissolved on May 10, 1930, prior to the 1930 Alberta general election.

Alberta's sixth government was controlled by the majority United Farmers of Alberta for the second time, led by Premier John Edward Brownlee. There was no Official Opposition in Alberta between 1926 and 1941 due to the Independent Movement which saw a majority of non-UFA candidates elected as independents. The Speaker was George Norman Johnston.

The 1926 Alberta general election formed the first legislature that was elected under Single Transferable Vote.

Bills

Sexual Sterilization Act

The Sexual Sterilization Act was an act passed by the Alberta Legislature in 1928. The Act, drafted to protect the gene pool, allowed for sterilization of mentally disabled persons in order to prevent the transmission of traits to offspring deemed undesirable, the act also created the Alberta Eugenics Board.

At that time, eugenicists argued that mental illness, mental retardation, epilepsy, alcoholism, pauperism, certain criminal behaviours, and social defects, such as prostitution and sexual perversion, were genetically determined and inherited. Further, it was widely believed that persons with these disorders had a higher reproduction rate than the normal population. As a result, it was feared the gene pool in the general population was weakening.
 
During the time the Sexual Sterilization Act was in effect, 4,800 cases were proposed for sterilization in the Province of Alberta, of which 99% received approval. Examination of sterilization records demonstrates that legislation did not apply equally to all members of society. Specifically, the Act was disproportionately applied to those in socially vulnerable positions, including females, children, unemployed persons, domestics, rural citizens, unmarried, institutionalized persons, Roman and Greek Catholics, and persons of Ukrainian, Native and Métis ethnicity.

The Act was repealed in 1972.

Alberta Natural Resources Act

The Alberta Natural Resources Act was an act passed by the Alberta Legislature in the fifth session in 1930. The Act facilitated the transfer from the Parliament of Canada and to the Province of Alberta control over crown lands and natural resources within these provinces from the federal government to the provincial governments. Alberta through the Alberta Act had not been given control over their natural resources  when they entered Confederation, unlike the other Canadian provinces.

The Alberta Natural Resource Transfer Agreement restricts the inherent hunting and fishing rights for indigenous peoples. “The Natural Resource Transfer Agreements with the three Western Provinces provide that laws respecting game in the province shall apply to Indians within the boundaries of the province”.

Membership in the 6th Alberta Legislature

Composition changes during the 6th Assembly

References

Further reading

External links
Alberta Legislative Assembly
Legislative Assembly of Alberta Members Book
By-elections 1905 to present

06th Alberta Legislative Assembly